Dexter Gregory Goei (born 1971) is an American businessman, and the president of Altice N.V, a multinational telecoms company, and chairman and CEO of its subsidiary Altice USA.

Early life
Dexter Goei was born in 1971, the son of Dr. Gordon Goei, an obstetrician/gynecologist in Beverly Hills, California. His father Gordon is a Chinese-Indonesian American born in Solo who moved to The Hague at age 10 and immigrated to the United States to study at Calvin College on a scholarship. His mother, a Dutch citizen, is also of Chinese-Indonesian descent. He has an older brother Danton G. Goei, who is a portfolio manager at Davis Selected Advisers. His family name is 魏 in Chinese.

In 1993, Goei graduated cum laude with a Bachelor of Science in Foreign Service degree in International Economics Major from the Edmund A. Walsh School of Foreign Service at Georgetown University.

Career
Before his appointment in June 2016 as president of Altice N.V., and chairman and CEO of Altice USA, Goei had served as CEO of Altice N.V. since he joined the company in 2009.

Goei led the company's entrance into the U.S. market through the acquisitions of Cablevision Systems Corporation (June 2016) and Suddenlink Communications (December 2015), which are now part of Altice USA.

Goei joined Altice in 2009, having worked for 15 years in investment banking with JP Morgan and then Morgan Stanley.

He serves on The Paley Center for Media's Board of Trustees.

Personal life
In 2016, he bought a house in New York's Greenwich Village for a reported $31 million. He lives in New York City with his wife and children.

References

1971 births
American chief executives
Walsh School of Foreign Service alumni
Living people
American investment bankers
American expatriates in Switzerland
JPMorgan Chase employees
Morgan Stanley employees
American people of Chinese descent
American people of Chinese-Indonesian descent
Indonesian people of Chinese descent